Velilla de San Antonio is a town in Spain. It is located in the Madrid Metropolitan Area, in the Community of Madrid. It had a population of 12,236 in 2019.

References

External links
 The official site of the city 

Municipalities in the Community of Madrid